The Front of National Revolutionary Action (FNRD; ; Фронт национал-революционного действия, FNRD) was a youth national-patriotic organization that existed in Russia at the end of the 20th century. Until the end of 1992, it was called the Union of Russian Youth (SRM).

History of creation 
The predecessor of the FNRD, the Union of Russian Youth, was formed on November 11, 1991. Officially, this date is the birthday of Fyodor Dostoevsky, however, according to the members of the CPM, the day was chosen due to the proximity to the date of Hitler's beer hall putschNovember 9. Leader: Ilya Lazarenko, ideologist Alexey Shiropaev. At first, the Union of Russian Youth was a classic Russian national-patriotic organization of that time: Orthodox fundamentalism, antisemitism, monarchism were preached in the ranks of the SRM, pre-revolutionary Russia and the White Guard were glorified. But already at this time, the SRM stood out for its radicalismthe members of the SRM called themselves "monarcho-fascists" and criticized the White Guard for the absence of a pogrom, Black Hundred worldview.

The Union of Russian Youth did not have official registration, although attempts were made to register the organization. The social base of the organization was students and schoolchildren; any Russian young man no older than 25 could become a member of the SRM.

For a short period, the SRM was considered the youth branch of the Christian Renaissance Union (HV), headed by Vladimir Osipov and Vyacheslav Demin, and also worked closely with the Russian Assembly, which was headed by taxi driver Igor Shcheglov, and the Cossack organizations near Moscow.

The SRM did not organize its own actions (at least officially), but took an active part in all events of a conservative nature. These were mainly congresses, rallies, prayers, processions held by the HV Union and the Pamyat Society, as well as mass events organized by the CPSU (for example, a rally for the preservation of the USSR on February 23, 1991, on Manezhnaya Square in Moscow).

Already in 1992, a disengagement from the traditional Orthodox-monarchist organizations took place: the SRM declared itself the legal successor of the All-Russian Fascist Party and the All-Russian National Revolutionary Labor and Workers 'and Peasants' Party of Fascists, which operated in the 30-40s among the Russian emigration. The name of the organization is also changingnow it is called the Union of Russian YouthNational Revolutionary Action (SRM-NRD), and since January 1993the Front of National Revolutionary Action (FNRD).

«In January, the Front for National Revolutionary Action was formed in Moscowa youth Russian radical right organization, involving cooperation with foreign national revolutionary movements defending the interests of white peoples. The FNRD has its own organthe newspaper "Our March". It is focused on the creation of a Russian new conservative ideology that embodies Orthodox, national and social ideals»

Ideology and propaganda 
The evolution of the name, and with it the ideology, can be clearly traced in the filing of the newspaper "Our Marsh", published by the organization since October 1992 with a circulation of up to 40 thousand copies. Here, for the first time, positive material about skinheads appears on the pages of the Russian-language media. In the programmatic articles "The Third Rus" by Ilya Lazarenko and "National Revolution" by Alexei Shiropaev, the authors disown traditional Russian nationalists (from the NPF «Pamyat» and similar organizations) and proclaim themselves the "new right". The transition from an archaic ideology to a radical concept of a national revolution, against the background of the failed liberal-market reforms in Russia in the early 1990s, attracts new personnel to the organization. The front is replenishing its ranks not only with former members of allied and like-minded organizations (RNU, Werewolf Legion, Nash Sovremennik magazine, etc.), but also with radicals from a completely opposite political camp. The organization consisted of people from the Democratic Union, the Union "Living Ring", Labour Russia

«Claiming to be the spokesman for the so-called. “Intellectual fascism”, the FNRD attempted to develop the theoretical foundations of the modern right-wing radical movement, and the newspaper “of front” also paid much attention to the history of the European “third way” and the Russian fascist movement in exile. As their ideological postulates, the leaders of the FNRD formulated the so-called. “20 points” (See: newspaper “Nash Marsh”. 1993. No. 4 (6))a short catechism of Russian fascism, which included their views on racial and state problems, the internal structure of “future Russia”, etc.» The FNRD calls on "nationally oriented youth to organize themselves to fight against Jewish agitation, against the occupation regime." The goal of the FNRD is to establish the "Great National Socialist Russian Empire" through the Russian national revolution. The leaders of the FNRD criticize Italian fascism (for "inconsistent racial policy") and German nazism (for preserving the capitalist system), calling their ideological base "total radicalism" and "national socialism of the Stalinist-Strasser type".
Ilya Lazarenko formulates the FNRD strategic program for the reorganization of Russia:

 The state structure of Third Russia will be based on the system of personal responsibility of the leaders, with the absolute power of the Leader of the Nation.
 A cohort of leaders of different levels will make up the National Elite, which will become hereditary.
 The rest of the population will be members of trade unions and national corporations, which are designed to become a means of managing the "mass" in the hands of the leaders.
 The idea of the ruler of the Russian State will be the Russian National Revolutionary ideology and the doctrine of an armed nation.
 A person's duty to ancestors and descendants is to keep his blood pure (doctrine of racial preference).
 The nationally proportional principle of representation in all spheres of public life.
 Planned Economy. Transport, communications, basic industries, the military-industrial complex and banks in the hands of the state.

Less ambitious plans are outlined in the populist Political Principles, published in May 1993. An attempt is again made to register the organization, as evidenced by the Charter of the Front of National Revolutionary Action, dated August 4, 1993a document clearly prepared for official registration and brought into line with the legislation of the Russian Federation in force at that time.

At the same time (spring 1993), an unofficial supplement to the newspaper "Our Marsh" appeareda samizdat mini-newspaper "Listochka", which in 1995 will be renamed into "Weapon plutonium", and then (1997-2000) into "Hooliganist" ... The editors of this exotic publication will emphasize their affiliation with the FNRD even after the formal termination of the organization's activities. In addition FNRD published several pamphlets: "Glory to Russia!", Dedicated to the activities of the head of RFP Konstantin Rodzaevsky, "The ideology of German National-socialism", "Letter to the Pope" of Léon Degrelle and others.

Symbolics 
According to the Charter of the Front of National Revolutionary Action:
 5.5. The front has its own symbolisman emblem (Novgorod (Celtic) cross) and a banner, as well as a hymn.
 5.6. The Front's badge bears its emblem and is issued at the time of admission to the FNRD.
 5.7. The dress uniform of the Front members is approved by the National Leadership
 5.8. For members of the Front, there is a special form of addressing each other"soratnik" (ally)
 5.9. Members of the front greet each other by raising their right hand ("Roman salute") and the words "Glory to Russia!" or "Glory to Victory!"
Flag of FNRD:

The design of the FNRD symbolism was developed by Shiropaev, an artist by training. For the Moscow (central) branch of the FNRD, 5 flags were made, four of which were lost for various reasons during the October 1993 events. In addition to these flags, the FNRD also used the black-yellow-white banners traditional for Russian nationalists.

Promotions, political unions, foreign contacts 

Since its inception, the FNRD has been proclaimed to be a right-wing radical organization, involving cooperation with foreign organizations of this kind. The first of these organizations was the NSDAP/AO (NSDAP Foreign Organization). Later, the leader of the NSDAP/AO Gerhard Lauck will end up in an Austrian prison. The photographs published by the media show that the wall in Lauk's prison cell was decorated with three newspapers: two published by himthe English-language New Order, the German-language NS Kampfruf, and the thirdthe Russian newspaper Nash Marsh, published by Ilya Lazarenko, with a portrait of Anastasy Vonsiatsky on the front page. It is also known about the FNRD's correspondence with the American KKK and contacts with Western European, Serbian, Bulgarian and other nationalists. One of the most notorious actions of the FNRD was the rally on March 22, 1994, at the South African embassy in defense of the white population of this country, against the dismantling of the apartheid system. Another well-known event of the FNRD-PNF is the annual Freedom to Texas action, held in various forms on February 14 for over 12 years.

The FNRD was looking for allies within Russia as well. At the end of 1992, the organization participates in the work of the National Salvation Front and in all actions of the "Irreconcilable Opposition". The closest interaction occurs between the FNRD and the publishing house «Arktogea», headed by Alexander Dugin: in February 1993, at the evening of the magazine "Elements", they proclaim the creation of the "Movement of the New Rights".

On May 1, 1993, the New Right Movement, the FNRD and the National Radical Party, led by Eduard Limonov, form the National Bolshevik Front, which will take part in the May 9, 1993, “Irreconcilable Opposition” march. However, the matter did not go further than a joint manifestation. It is known about the fact of participation of members of the FNRD in clashes with riot police on Gagarinskaya Square on May 1, 1993.

FNRD after 1993 
After the shooting of the White House and the defeat of the opposition against the FNRD (as well as against many other organizations), sanctions from the executive branch followed: by order of the Minister of Press and Information of the Russian Federation Shumeiko No. 199 dated October 14, 1993, the newspaper Nash Marsh was banned.

«Guided by the Decree of the President of the Russian Federation No. 1400 dated 09.21.93, to terminate the activities of the newspapers Den, Russkoe Delo, Russkoe sunday, Russkie vedomosti, Russkie Pulse, Russkiy order, Za Rus!, Our march "," Nationalist "," Russian word "," Moscow tavern "," Russian Union "," To the ax ", as their content is directly aimed at calls for a violent change of the constitutional order, inciting ethnic hatred, propaganda of war, which became one of the factors that provoked the riots that took place in Moscow in September–October 1993.

Printing houses and publishing complexes to stop publishing these newspapers.

However, taking advantage of the amnesty announced by the State Duma on February 23, 1994, the FNRD continued to publish the newspaper, but now under the name “People's System”. Subsequently, Narodny Stroy was also closed, and a criminal case was initiated against its editor Ilya Lazarenko on the fact of “inciting ethnic hatred”. In connection with the announcement of an amnesty dedicated to the 50th anniversary of the victory in the Great Patriotic War of 1941–1945, he was amnestied.

In 1994–1995, the religious views of I. Lazarenko evolved sharply, which caused bewilderment of the majority of the FNRD members. In this regard, Lazarenko dissolves the FNRD and forms a completely new structurethe National Front Party (PNF), and then a new religious organizationClan Navi ("Sacred Church of the White Race"). Despite this, the group of Ilya Lazarenko in the media and reference books for a long time continues to be called the "Front of National Revolutionary Action." In addition, a group of associates (mostly Orthodox) continued to call themselves the FNRD.

The symbolism also changes somewhat: at the last stage of its existence, the FNRD, as well as new organizations, use red flags with a black Novgorod cross in a white circle in the center.

Despite religious differences, there was no talk of a political split between these groups: both of them participate in seminars "The Future of Russia" at Moscow State University in 1995, in the unification congress of Russian radical organizations in 1998, in the elections to the State Duma of the Russian Federation according to the lists movement "For Faith and Fatherland" in 1999, etc.

In 1998, on the eve of the National Front congress, Ilya Lazarenko officially transferred the right to use the name and symbols of the FNRD to Mikhail Moiseev, a member of the CPM-FNRD since 1992. The National Revolutionary Action Front, revived in this way, took part in the work of the congress as a collective member, representing the Orthodox wing of the movement. The last known action organized by the FNRD (together with the PNF) was an evening in memory of Baron von Ungern-Sternberg, at the Mayakovsky Museum on September 18, 1999.

References

1991 establishments in Russia
Christian fundamentalism
Far-right political parties
Fascist parties in Russia
Neo-Nazism in Russia
Political parties established in 1991
Strasserism